The Government Ayurveda Medical College and Hospital, (est. 1908) in Mysore is a government run Ayurveda (traditional Indian medicine) college and hospital. It is considered to be to the oldest academic institute in India teaching Ayurvedic medicine.

College
The college offers undergraduate courses leading to a Bachelor of Ayurvedic Medicine and Surgery (BAMS) degree and post-graduate courses leading to a Doctor of Medicine (MD) degree in the fields of Ayurveda Siddhantha or Ayurveda Kayachikitsa. In 2018 two new pg department started in panchakarama and swasthavritta.

The college is affiliated with the Rajiv Gandhi University of Health Sciences in Bangalore, a unitary university set up in 1996 by the government of Karnataka for the regulation and promotion of higher education in health sciences throughout the state. It also adheres to all the regulations for education in traditional medicine laid down by the Central Council of Indian Medicine (CCIM), New Delhi.

Sources

External links 

 Government Ayurveda Medical College and Hospital, Mysore  - official website

Ayurveda hospitals
Ayurvedic colleges in Karnataka
Colleges affiliated to Rajiv Gandhi University of Health Sciences
Educational institutions established in 1908
1908 establishments in India
Universities and colleges in Mysore